The 2005–06 United Hockey League season was the 15th season of the United Hockey League (Colonial Hockey League before 1997), a North American minor professional league. 14 teams participated in the regular season and the Kalamazoo Wings won the league title.

Offseason
The Port Huron Flags joined as an expansion team. The Flags are named after the IHL team of the same name.

The Port Huron Beacons relocated to Roanoke, Virginia to become the Roanoke Valley Vipers. This came after the Roanoke Express was revoked by the ECHL in 2004.

The Kansas City Outlaws suspended operations and folded due to poor attendance followed by a failed attempt to relocate to Toledo, Ohio and a lawsuit by Superior Color Graphics for non payment.

Regular season

Colonial Cup-Playoffs

External links
 Season 2005/06 on hockeydb.com

United Hockey League seasons
UHL
UHL